Ignacy Nowak (born 12 January 1949) is a Polish chess player who won the Polish Chess Championship in 1985. Nowak achieved the rank of FIDE Master in 1983.

Chess career

From 1971 to 1990, Nowak participated in the Polish Chess Championships twelve times. In 1985 in Gdynia he shared first/third place, and then won an additional tournament in Warsaw, a half point ahead of Jan Adamski. In the Polish Team Chess Championship, Nowak represented the Poznań chess club twice in 1985 and 1988 and won the team event. Nowak also won the Polish Blitz Championships twice in 1973 and 1987.
Since 1999 he has not been involved in serious chess tournaments.

References

External links

 
 

1949 births
Living people
Polish chess players
Chess FIDE Masters